Kaptol is a part of Zagreb, Croatia in the Upper Town and it is the seat of the Roman Catholic archbishop of Zagreb. Due to its historical associations, in Croatian "Kaptol" is also used as a metonym for the leadership of the Roman Catholic Church in Croatia.

History

The existence of Kaptol, the settlement on the east slope, was confirmed in 1094 when King Ladislaus founded the Zagreb diocese. The bishop, his residence and the Cathedral had their seat in the southeast part of the Kaptol hill. VIaška Ves was situated in the close vicinity of the Cathedral. Being under the bishop's jurisdiction, it was first mentioned in 1198. Kaptol Street ran from the south to the north across the Kaptol terrace with canons' residences arranged in rows alongside. As the Latin word for a group or body of canons is "capitulum" (kaptol), it is clear how Kaptol got its name. The canons also ruled this settlement.

The Cathedral was consecrated in 1217, but later in 1242 it was badly damaged during the Mongol invasion. After 1263 it was restored and rebuilt. As a settlement, Kaptol's shape was an unsymmetrical rectangle, which had a southern entrance in Bakačeva Street, and ended at its north end near the present day Kaptol School (Miroslav Krleža Elementary School).

In the Middle Ages, Kaptol had no fortifications. It was merely enclosed with wooden fences or palisades, which were repeatedly destroyed and rebuilt. The defensive walls and towers around Kaptol were built between 1469 and 1473. The Prislin Tower near the Kaptol School is one of the best-preserved from those times. In 1493 the Turks reached Sisak trying to capture it but were defeated there. Therefore, fearing the Turkish invasion, the Bishop of Zagreb had the fortifications built around the Cathedral and his residence. The defensive towers and walls built between 1512 and 1520 have been preserved until the present day except those that directly faced the front of the Cathedral situated at Kaptol Square. This section of the wall was pulled down in 1907.

In the 13th century two Gothic churches were built in Kaptol, St. Francis with the Franciscan monastery and St. Mary, which underwent considerable reconstruction works in the 17th and the 18th centuries. In Opatovina, small dwelling houses of former Kaptol inhabitants can still be seen, but at Dolac a number of little and narrow streets were torn down in 1926 when the today's market was built. In 1334 the canons of Zagreb established a colony of Kaptol serfs in the vicinity of their residences, north of Kaptol. That was the beginning of a new settlement called Nova Ves (the present day Nova Ves Street).

Neighbourhood

Kaptol is today part of the Gornji Grad - Medveščak city district. It mainly faces the Kaptol Street, lying atop of the Ribnjak Park in the east. The Kaptol Centar shopping mall is located in Nova Ves.

The central part of Kaptol is part of the local government "August Cesarec" that has a total population of 1,523 (2011).

See also
History of Croatia
History of Zagreb
Ban Jelačić Square
Gradec
St. Mark's Church
Zagreb Cathedral
Kaptol manors in Zagreb

Views of Kaptol

References

External links
 guide.ndo.co.uk

Gornji Grad–Medveščak
History of Zagreb